The 2008 NBA Europe Live Tour was a basketball exhibition tour featuring teams from the NBA, as a part of the NBA Global Games. The hosting countries were England, France, Germany and Spain. The NBA teams traveled to Europe to play preseason games against each other from October 9 to October 17.

Teams
The four NBA teams that participated were:
 Miami Heat
 New Jersey Nets
 New Orleans Hornets
 Washington Wizards

Games

External links
The official information page
2008 NBA Europe Live Tour @ nba.com

NBA Global Games
Europe
2008–09 Euroleague